Pierre-Hugues Herbert and Nicolas Mahut were the defending champions but Mahut chose not to participate. Herbert partnered Jan-Lennard Struff, but they lost in the quarterfinals to Nikola Mektić and Mate Pavić.

Mektić and Pavić won the title, defeating Kevin Krawietz and Horia Tecău in the final, 7–6(9–7), 6–2.

Seeds

Draw

Draw

Qualifying

Seeds

Qualifiers
  Sander Arends /  David Pel

Qualifying draw

References

External links
 Main draw
 Qualifying draw

2021 ATP Tour
Doubles